Alice Davis may refer to:
 Alice Estes Davis (1929–2022), American costume designer
 Alice Brown Davis (1852–1935), first female Principal Chief of the Seminole Nation of Oklahoma

See also
 Alice Hart-Davis, British journalist and  author
 Alice Davies, British suffragette and nurse